Ernst Paul Specker (11 February 1920, Zürich – 10 December 2011, Zürich) was a Swiss mathematician. Much of his most influential work was on Quine's New Foundations, a set theory with a universal set, but he is most famous for the Kochen–Specker theorem in quantum mechanics, showing that certain types of hidden variable theories are impossible. He also proved the ordinal partition relation ω2 → (ω2,3)2, thereby solving a problem of Erdős.

Specker received his Ph.D. in 1949 from ETH Zurich, where he  remained throughout his professional career.

See also
 Specker sequence
 Baer–Specker group

References

External links 
 Biography  at the University of St. Andrews
 Ernst Specker (1920-2011), Martin Fürer, January 25, 2012.
 Ernst Specker:Selecta, Birkhauser, 1990.

1920 births
2011 deaths
ETH Zurich alumni
Academic staff of ETH Zurich
Scientists from Zürich
Set theorists
Swiss mathematicians
20th-century Swiss mathematicians